The 2017 Georgia Swarm season is the 2nd season of the Georgia Swarm, a lacrosse team based in Duluth, Georgia playing in the National Lacrosse League. The team was formerly based in Saint Paul, Minnesota and was known as the Minnesota Swarm.

Regular season

Final standings

Game log

Playoffs

Roster

Entry Draft
The 2016 NLL Entry Draft took place on September 26, 2016. The Swarm made the following selections:

See also
2017 NLL season

References

Georgia Swarm
Georgia Swarm
Georgia Swarm seasons